See Admirable-class minesweeper.

List of Admirable class ships

 
 
 
 
 
 
 
 
 
 
 
 
 
 
 
 
 
 
 
 
 
 
 
 
 
 
 
 
 
 
 
 
 
 
 
 
 
 
 
 
 
 
 
 USS Embroil (AM-227) (canceled)
 USS Enhance (AM-228) (canceled)
 USS Equity (AM-229) (canceled)
 USS Esteem (AM-230) (canceled)
 USS Event (AM-231) (canceled)
 
 
 
 
 USS Flame (AM-236) (canceled)
 USS Fortify (AM-237) (canceled)
 
 
 
 
 
 USS Illusive (AM-243) (canceled)
 USS Imbue (AM-244) (canceled)
 USS Impervious (AM-245) (canceled)
 
 
 
 
 
 
 
 
 
 
 
 
 
 
 
 
 
 
 
 
 
 
 
 
 
 
 
 
 
 
 
 
 USS Project (AM–278)
 
 
 
 
 
 
 
 
 
 
 
 USS Reproof (AM-290) (canceled)
 USS Risk (AM-291) (canceled)
 USS Rival (AM-292) (canceled)
 USS Sagacity (AM-293) (canceled)
 
 
 
 
 
 
 
 
 
 
 
 
 
 
 
 
 
 
 
 
 
 
 
 
 
 
 
 USS Hummer (AM-367) (canceled)
 USS Jackdaw (AM-368) (canceled)
 USS Minah (AM-370) (canceled)
 USS Albatross (AM-391) (canceled)
 USS Bullfinch (AM-392) (canceled)
 USS Cardinal (AM-393) (canceled)
 USS Firecrest (AM-394) (canceled)
 USS Goldfinch (AM-395) (canceled)
 USS Grackle (AM-396) (canceled)
 USS Grosbeak (AM-397) (canceled)
 USS Grouse (AM-398) (canceled)
 USS Gull (AM-399) (canceled)
 USS Hawk (AM-400) (canceled)
 USS Hummer (AM-401) (canceled)
 USS Jackdaw (AM-402) (canceled)
 USS Kite (AM-403) (canceled)
 USS Longspur (AM-404) (canceled)
 USS Merganser (AM-405) (canceled)
 USS Osprey (AM-406) (canceled)
 USS Partridge (AM–407) (canceled)
 USS Plover (AM-408) (canceled)
 USS Redhead (AM-409) (canceled)
 USS Sanderling (AM-410) (canceled)
 USS Scaup (AM-411) (canceled)
 ) (canceled)
 USS Shearwater (AM-413) (canceled)
 USS Waxbill (AM-414) (canceled)
 USS Bluebird (AM-415) (canceled)
 USS Flicker (AM-416) (canceled)
 USS Linnet (AM-417) (canceled)
 USS Magpie (AM-418) (canceled)
 USS Parrakeet (AM–419) (canceled)
 USS Pipit (AM–420) (canceled)

External links
 United States Navy Historical Center Website

Lists of ships of the United States